"Heavy Music" is a song first released as a single by Bob Seger & the Last Heard. Two different vocal takes of the song (using the same instrumental track) were released together on either side of the single, with the names "Heavy Music Part 1" and "Heavy Music Part 2".  An eight-minute fourteen-second-long live version of the song is featured on the album Live Bullet with the Silver Bullet Band.

Writing and production 
The song is about listening to music and the emotions it evokes, but misunderstandings arose. Seger denied those took a sexual reading of the lyric: "A lot of people really misconstrued it. That was a song about the music, but a lot of people thought it was a song about music and sex, the two together. There was nothing sexual in it, it was simply read in by a lot of program directors. The part about 'goin' deeper.'"

Success 
The single proved to be Seger's most successful work to date, climbing to the number one position on the Detroit charts and gaining him some exposure outside of the Detroit area.  For a time it looked like it would be Seger's ticket to a national breakthrough, until the label Cameo-Parkway went out of business just as the song was gaining popularity.  The track ended up peaking at number 103 nationally in the US on Billboard; it was actually a bigger hit in Canada, peaking at number 82 on the RPM charts.  Still, the success of "Heavy Music" aided in landing Seger his first contract with Capitol Records.

In popular culture
Heavy Music was utilized for the American trailers for three Westerns starring Tony Anthony: A Stranger in Town (1967), Blindman (1971) and Get Mean (1975). This creative decision was likely fostered by Allen Klein, the producer of the first two films, who had acquired the single's label Cameo-Parkway Records by the time A Stranger in Town was being prepared for its US release.

Chart performance

References

External links 
 Bob Seger & The Last Heard - "Heavy Music Part 1" (1967) song to be listened as stream at Spotify.com
 Bob Seger & the Silver Bullet Band - "Heavy Music" (Live: Get out of Denver 1974) song to be listened as stream at Spotify.com
 Bob Seger & the Silver Bullet Band - "Heavy Music" (Live in Detroit 1975) song to be listened as stream at Spotify.com
 Bob Seger - "Heavy Music" (Live on Air) song to be listened as stream at Spotify.com

1967 singles
Bob Seger songs
Songs written by Bob Seger
1967 songs
Cameo-Parkway Records singles